Berlin Cosmopolitan School (BCS) is a non-profit international school located in Berlin, Germany.  The school offers preschool, kindergarten, primary and secondary schooling.  BCS is an authorised International Baccalaureate World School and follows the Primary Years Programme (PYP) and the Diploma Programme (DP). The primary language of instruction is English with some classes taught in German. In order to graduate students can choose to take part in the IB Diploma Programme, the bilingual Abitur or both.

History
The school opened as a pre-school in 2004, as a primary school in 2007, and as a secondary school in 2009. It became an authorised International Baccalaureate World School on 18 February 2013.

References

External links
Official website
http://www.internationalschoolsreview.com/international-schools/berlin_cosmopolitan_school.htm

Schools in Berlin
International Baccalaureate schools in Germany
Mitte
Educational institutions established in 2004
2004 establishments in Germany

International schools in Germany